The Graphic Arts Education and Research Foundation is an organization whose mission is to advance knowledge and education in the field of graphic communications by supporting programs that prepare the workforce of the future.

GAERF was founded in 1983 by the National Association for Printing Leadership (NAPL), NPES The Association for Suppliers of Printing, Publishing and Converting Technologies and the Printing Industries of America. These three national associations jointly own the Graphic Arts Show Company (GASC). GAERF was created to channel a portion of the revenues earned by GASC-managed shows, such as GRAPH EXPO and PRINT, into projects supporting a strong future for the industry.

GAERF has its offices at the NPES headquarters in Reston, Virginia.

GAERF administers PrintED, a national accreditation and certification program, based on industry standards, for graphic communications courses of study at the secondary and post-secondary levels.

External links 
GAERF Website

Organizations based in Virginia